Paul Wickens (born 27 March 1956) is an English musician, composer, and record producer, professionally known as Wix. In a career spanning more than 40 years, Wickens has worked with artists including Nik Kershaw, Bob Dylan, Joni Mitchell, Bon Jovi, Edie Brickell, Kevin Coyne and many others. Wickens has been a member of the Paul McCartney Band since 1989.

Career
In the early 1980s Wickens was a member of Woodhead Monroe, a band that issued two singles distributed by Stiff, "Mumbo Jumbo" and "Identify."

Wickens began touring with Paul McCartney in 1989. Since then, Wickens has served as the musical director for many of McCartney's tours. He continues to tour with McCartney (as his keyboardist, occasional guitarist and backing vocalist), and of the four musicians in McCartney's touring band, he has worked with McCartney the longest by a considerable margin.

Wickens played on albums by Tommy Shaw of the American rock band Styx, the Damned, Tim Finn, Paul Carrack, Nik Kershaw, Jim Diamond, Boy George, and David Gilmour, and was the co-producer of the first Savage Progress album. He also was the keyboardist and programmer for Edie Brickell & New Bohemians album, Shooting Rubberbands at the Stars – which was where he first met Chris Whitten. Wickens was also instrumental in making the BANDAGED album the success it was, in aid of BBC Children in Need.

Wickens played accordion on The The's minor UK hit "This Is the Day", from their album Soul Mining. He also recorded a version of Nirvana's "Smells Like Teen Spirit".

He attended Brentwood School, Essex where he became a friend of fellow student, the writer Douglas Adams. Wickens composed the music for the sequel radio productions of Adams' Hitchhiker's Guide to the Galaxy, originally broadcast in 2003–2004. Wickens performed at the author's memorial service in 2001.

Selected discography

Music producer

Performer

References

External links
 
 Paul Wickens at Discogs

1956 births
Living people
Musicians from Essex
Edie Brickell & New Bohemians members
People from Brentwood, Essex
People educated at Brentwood School, Essex
English rock keyboardists
English record producers
English songwriters
English rock singers
English session musicians
Paul McCartney Band members